Aneurin Riley Livermore (born 18 January 2003) is a Welsh footballer who plays as a midfielder for Hereford. He got his first start for Newport in the 3–1 EFL Trophy defeat to Plymouth Argyle. Livermore made his football league debut for Newport on 4 September 2021 as a second-half substitute in the 2-2 League Two draw against Leyton Orient. He was released by Newport at the end of the 2021–22 season.

On 25 February 2023, Livermore signed for National League North club Hereford.

International
On 29 September 2021 Livermore was called up to the Wales Under 19 squad for the 2022 UEFA European Under-19 Championship qualifying matches in Norway against Georgia, Norway and Kosovo on 6, 9 and 12 October 2021.

References

External links

Living people
Welsh footballers
Association football midfielders
English Football League players
Newport County A.F.C. players
2003 births